Bryan Reffner is a former NASCAR Craftsman Truck Series driver. He was also a champion in the American Speed Association.

Career prior to NASCAR
Reffner began racing at age 16. Reffner became a regular competitor in the late model division at Madison International Speedway. He was named the ARTGO Series (now NASCAR AutoZone Elite Division, Midwest Series) rookie-of-the-year in 1983. Reffner won three track championships in 1989 and 1990.

Reffner moved to the American Speed Association in 1994, and became the 1995 ASA champion.

NASCAR career
Reffner made his Craftsman Truck Series debut in 1996, winning Rookie of the Year, driving the #44 1-800-COLLECT Ford for Mark Simo. He finished the year with 3 top fives, 9 top tens, and three poles, finishing ninth in the points. He continued to run full-time in 1997, posting two top-tens for Dale Phelon. In 1998, he started the year with Phelon, but was released, and spent the rest of the season running with Liberty Racing and MB Motorsports. He had eight top-tens and finished 22nd in points.

1999 turned out to be a short year for him, as he ran only 13 races. He started the year signed to drive for a new two-truck operation, Ridge Gate Motion Sports, owned by Mike Clark and Dominic Dobson. However, he left the team early in the season as he felt the team had not lived up to its obligations, and spent the year with Conely Racing, running thirteen races. In 2000 however, he had a breakthrough year, driving for Team Menard. He won his first career race at Texas Motor Speedway, (a race that unfortunately marked the death of Tony Roper) and having 16 top tens, finishing 9th in the points. Four races into 2001 however, Team Menard suspended operations, and Reffner ran just a handful of races, for Conely and TKO Motorsports. He had three top-tens during that season. He ran three races in 2002, his best finish a thirteenth at Michigan. He also made his Busch Series debut at Michigan. Driving the #0 for Conely, he started 25th and finished 29th. In 2003, he made his last two CTS starts to date, driving his self-owned #80 at Richmond and Homestead.

In 2003 he returned to the American Speed Association, and finished sixth in points.

In 2005, Reffner made two starts for Smith Bros. Racing, but failed to finish higher than 35th. He also made a failed attempt at qualifying for the NEXTEL Cup Phoenix race with Competitive Edge Motorsports. He also was leading the points in the American Stockcar League series going into the final 3 races of 2005 and was declared the ASL Champion when the final races were canceled.

Motorsports career results

NASCAR
(key) (Bold – Pole position awarded by qualifying time. Italics – Pole position earned by points standings or practice time. * – Most laps led.)

Nextel Cup Series

Busch Series

Craftsman Truck Series

ARCA Re/Max Series
(key) (Bold – Pole position awarded by qualifying time. Italics – Pole position earned by points standings or practice time. * – Most laps led.)

References

External links
  (from Internet Archive)
 
 Rocky road for Reffner

American Speed Association drivers
ARCA Midwest Tour drivers
NASCAR drivers
Living people
1963 births
People from Rudolph, Wisconsin
Racing drivers from Wisconsin